"Unknown Stuntman" is a single sung by Lee Majors, released in 1984, written by Glen A. Larson, Gail Jensen, and Dave Somerville, and with a 2-minute and 38 second running time. A shorter version (1:47 and with slightly different instrumentation) was used as the theme song for the television series The Fall Guy, in which Majors starred as the title character, a stunt double who worked as a bounty hunter when not filming stunts. 

Larson, the creator of The Fall Guy, had a musical background as a member of and songwriter for the 1960s folk group The Four Preps; Somerville was also a member of the same group (albeit not at the same time).

The lyrics make several references to major film stars of the day, such as Farrah Fawcett (Majors' then estranged wife), Bo Derek, Sally Field, Jaclyn Smith, Cheryl Ladd, Cheryl Tiegs, Raquel Welch, Robert Redford, Clint Eastwood, and Burt Reynolds.

The song is the closing theme to The Craig Ferguson Radio Show. It has been covered multiple times and in a karaoke version, as well as being the title of an EP by musical artists Black & Kent with other song titles paying homage to Lee Majors.

See also
List of 1980s one-hit wonders in the United States

References

1984 singles
Television drama theme songs
1984 songs
Songs written by Glen A. Larson